The Plymouth City Patriots are a professional basketball team based in Plymouth, England. Established in 2021, the team compete in the British Basketball League, the country's premier basketball competition, making their debut in the 2021–22 season. The Patriots currently play their home games at the Plymouth Pavilions.

History
The Patriots were founded in Plymouth in 2021 following the demise and closure of the Plymouth Raiders, the city's former basketball team which had competed in the top-flight British Basketball League since 2004. The Raiders had withdrawn from the British Basketball League following the 2020–21 season attributed to increasing rental costs of their home venue, the Plymouth Pavilions, though later investigations revealed that the Raiders organisation had accumulated a debt of over £800,000, including unpaid taxes amounting to £161,882.

In July 2021, it was announced by the league that the city of Plymouth would continue to have a franchise in the league for the 2021–22 season, led by local businessman and former Raiders sponsor, Carl Heslop. 

On 9 August 2021, it was announced that the new franchise will be called the Plymouth City Patriots; the new organisation could not secure the transfer of the naming and branding rights from Plymouth Raiders 1983 Ltd, the previous owners. A one-year deal was agreed with Raiders' former home venue, the Plymouth Pavilions, to stage home games for the newly launched Patriots whilst the club actively sought viable venues to move to once the deal expired  – this deal was later extended for the entire 2022–23 season.

On 10 August 2021, it was announced by the Patriots that Paul James was appointed as inaugural head coach whilst, on 27 August, former Plymouth Raiders shooting guard Denzel Ubiaro was announced as the team's first player signing. Patriots played their first competitive game on 25 September, a 84-75 loss at Bristol Flyers in the opening round of the BBL Cup. On 17 November, Great Britain international Kofi Josephs scored 46 points in a home defeat to Manchester Giants, a record for the most points scored in a BBL game by a British-born player.

The Patriots' first competitive victory came on 9 January 2022, when they defeated Basketball Wales 113-66 in the first round of the BBL Trophy. The following week, on 14 January, Patriots claimed their first regular season win after defeating Surrey Scorchers, 82-73, at the Plymouth Pavilions. Patriots' form in February saw the team finish the month with a 5-2 win record, earning head coach Paul James and point guard Antonio Williams the Coach and Player of the Month awards respectively.

Patriots finished their inaugural campaign in eighth position in the BBL Championship standings and qualified for the post-season Play-offs thanks to a vital home victory over Newcastle Eagles in the final game of the regular season. Their appearance in the Play-offs was short-lived however, as they lost to eventual winners Leicester Riders with a 16-point aggregate defeat in the Quarter-final two-game series.

Home venues
Plymouth Pavilions (2021–present)

Season-by-season records

Players

Squad information

Depth chart

Notable former players

 Rowell Graham-Bell (2021–2022)
 Kofi Josephs (2021–2022)
 Antonio Williams (2021–2023)

See also
 British Basketball League
 Plymouth Raiders

References

Plymouth City Patriots
Sport in Plymouth, Devon
Basketball teams in England
Men's sports teams in England
British Basketball League teams
Basketball teams established in 2021
2021 establishments in England